Wilker Henrique da Silva (born 26 October 1995), commonly known as Wilker, is a Brazilian footballer who currently plays for Ypiranga-AP.

Career statistics

Club

Notes

References

1995 births
Living people
Brazilian footballers
Brazilian expatriate footballers
Association football forwards
Campeonato Brasileiro Série B players
Campeonato Brasileiro Série D players
Botafogo Futebol Clube (SP) players
Associação Atlética Ponte Preta players
Clube Atlético Bragantino players
União Agrícola Barbarense Futebol Clube players
Paragominas Futebol Clube players
Simba S.C. players
Brazilian expatriate sportspeople in Tanzania
Expatriate footballers in Tanzania
Tanzanian Premier League players